The Lok Rajya Party is a political party in the Indian state of Maharashtra. The LRP is based amongst the Backward Castes.

References

Political parties in Maharashtra
Political parties established in 2004
2004 establishments in Maharashtra